The British Army is listed according to an order of precedence for the purposes of parading. This is the order in which the various corps of the army parade, from right to left, with the unit at the extreme right being highest. Under ordinary circumstances, the Household Cavalry parades at the extreme right of the line. Militia and Army Reserve units take precedence after Regular units with the exception of The Honourable Artillery Company and The Royal Monmouthshire Royal Engineers.

Order of precedence
In the British Army's Order of Precedence, the Household Cavalry is always listed first and parades at the extreme right of the line. However, when the Royal Horse Artillery is on parade with its guns it takes precedence.
 
Household Cavalry
Royal Horse Artillery 
Royal Armoured Corps
Royal Regiment of Artillery
Corps of Royal Engineers
Royal Corps of Signals
Infantry
Foot Guards
Line Infantry
Rifles
Special Air Service
Army Air Corps
Special Reconnaissance Regiment
Royal Army Chaplains' Department
Royal Logistic Corps
Royal Army Medical Corps
Royal Electrical and Mechanical Engineers
Adjutant General's Corps
Royal Army Veterinary Corps
Small Arms School Corps
Royal Army Dental Corps
Intelligence Corps
Royal Army Physical Training Corps
General Service Corps
Queen Alexandra's Royal Army Nursing Corps
Royal Corps of Army Music
Royal Monmouthshire Royal Engineers (Militia) (Army Reserve)
Honourable Artillery Company (Although Army Reserve Regiments, they are included in the order of arms Regular Army)
Remainder of the Army Reserve
Royal Gibraltar Regiment
Royal Bermuda Regiment

Household Cavalry, Royal Armoured Corps and Infantry orders of precedence

Cavalry, Tank and infantry regiments of the British Army are listed in their own orders of precedence, which dates back to when regiments had numbers rather than names. The order comes from the start of the regiment's service under the Crown, up to 1881 and the "Cardwell Reforms", when the use of numbers was abolished in favour of linking with and using county names. The regiments of the Household Division are always listed first, as they are the most senior, followed by the line regiments. In today's army, which has many regiments formed through amalgamations of other regiments, the rank in the order of precedence is that of the more senior of the amalgamated units. It is for this reason that the Princess of Wales's Royal Regiment, one of the youngest in the army, is ranked second in the line infantry order – it is the direct descendant of the 2nd Regiment of Foot.

Cavalry and RTR order of precedence
The majority of line cavalry regiments in the British Army now form part of a wider administrative formation called the Royal Armoured Corps, along with the Royal Tank Regiment. The two cavalry guards regiments are part of a separate administrative formation called the Household Cavalry.

Infantry order of precedence
The infantry is ranked in the order of Foot Guards, Line infantry, Rifles.  The Royal Marines, as the descendant of the old Army marine regiments of the 17th and 18th centuries, were included in the Order of Precedence after the descendant of the 49th Foot (the Royal Gloucestershire, Berkshire and Wiltshire Light Infantry (RGBWLI)), which was the last line regiment of foot formed prior to the formation of the Royal Marines, when not on parade with the Royal Navy. On the completion of the infantry reorganisation in 2007, the RGBWLI, along with the Devonshire and Dorset Light Infantry, the Light Infantry and the Royal Green Jackets, were absorbed into what has become part of The Rifles, and moved last in the Order of Precedence. As of April 2008 the Royal Marines are considered to no longer be a separate arm of the Royal Navy, but rather an integral part of it. Therefore, they no longer have a place amongst the (Army) infantry regiments and now take their place as part of the Royal Navy and parade on the right of the line. Even if there is no other Naval contingent present they are the senior formation on ceremonial occasions. If other contingents of the Royal Navy are on parade, the Royal Marines take their place after them, but before all army regiments and corps.

Precedence within the Army Reserve
The Royal Monmouthshire Royal Engineers (Militia)
The Honourable Artillery Company
Royal Armoured Corps
The Royal Yeomanry
The Royal Wessex Yeomanry
The Queen's Own Yeomanry
The Scottish and North Irish Yeomanry
Royal Regiment of Artillery 
Corps of Royal Engineers
Royal Corps of Signals
Infantry
52nd Lowland, 6th Battalion The Royal Regiment of Scotland
51st Highland, 7th Battalion The Royal Regiment of Scotland
3rd Battalion, The Princess of Wales's Royal Regiment (Queen's and Royal Hampshires)
4th Battalion, The Princess of Wales's Royal Regiment (Queen's and Royal Hampshires)
4th Battalion, The Duke of Lancaster's Regiment (King's, Lancashire and Border)
5th Battalion, The Royal Regiment of Fusiliers
3rd Battalion, The Royal Anglian Regiment
4th Battalion, The Yorkshire Regiment (14th/15th, 19th & 33rd/76th Foot)
4th Battalion, The Mercian Regiment
3rd Battalion, The Royal Welsh
2nd Battalion, The Royal Irish Regiment (27th Inniskilling), 83rd, 87th & Ulster Defence Regiment
4th Battalion, The Parachute Regiment
6th Battalion, The Rifles
7th Battalion, The Rifles
Special Air Service
21st Special Air Service Regiment (Artists)
23rd Special Air Service Regiment
Army Air Corps
The Royal Logistic Corps 
Royal Army Medical Corps
Corps of Royal Electrical and Mechanical Engineers
Adjutant General's Corps 
Intelligence Corps

Precedence of the UK Auxiliary Forces
Reserve Forces (generally known, after the 1859 creation and re-organisation under the Reserve Force Act, 1867 of the Regular Reserve of the British Army, as Local Forces or Auxiliary Forces), including the Militia (or Constitutional Force), Yeomanry, Volunteer Force, and Fencibles, were not originally considered parts of the British Army (which, prior to the 1855 abolishment of the Board of Ordnance was not the only Regular Force, being composed primarily of cavalry and infantry units while the Royal Artillery, Royal Engineers, and Royal Sappers and Miners belonged to the Board of Ordnance and were known collectively as the Ordnance Military Corps in distinction to the board's civilian Commissariat, ordnance stores, transport and other departments). 

During the latter 19th Century and early 20th Century, the auxiliary forces (each of which had its own order or precedence: Yeomanry order-of-precedence; Militia order-of-precedence; Volunteer Force order-of-precedence) in the UK were increasingly integrated with British Army units, while maintaining separate force hierarchies. In the process, they were removed from the control of the Lords-Lieutenant of Counties and administered directly by the War Office. The only point of distinction between a British Army unit and an auxiliary, whether in the UK-proper or a colony, was whether or not it was wholly or partly funded by the War Office (from Army funds). As Militia Tax and other funds were replaced for UK auxiliary units, they were added to the British Army order of precedence. 

Although most auxiliary units had in 1881 (after the Cardwell and Childers Reforms) become companies or battalions of regular army corps or regiments, they were not grouped with their regular companies or battalions in the British Army order of precedence. Instead, each entire force was added separately to the order of precedence of the British Army, with its respective units retaining their original orders of precedence within that (where the force contained units of more than one corps, they were grouped and took precedence also in accordance with their parent corps of the regular army; eg., Militia Artillery units took precedence ahead of Militia Infantry, with Militia Artillery units having their own internal order of precedence, starting with the Antrim Artillery Militia, numbered 1st, whereas for the Militia Infantry of England and Wales the 3rd West York (Light Infantry) numbered 1st (in 1855), and was also titled the First Regiment of Militia. 

The most senior Volunteer Force artillery corps was the 1st Northumberland Artillery Volunteer Corps formed on 2 August, 1859. The Exeter and South Devon Volunteers numbered first in the order of precedence of the Volunteer Infantry. The senior Yeomanry unit, numbering 1st, was the Royal Wiltshire Yeomanry. None of these were to be confused with, by example, the 1st Foot Guards (Grenadier Guards), 1st Regiment of Foot of the British Army (Royal Scots)). The Yeomanry, as cavalry, took precedence over the Militia, despite being far younger. The older Militia took precedence over the younger Volunteer Force. In 1908, the auxiliary forces in the UK were reorganised, with the Yeomanry and Volunteer Force becoming the Territorial Force (in 1921 renamed the Territorial Army), and the Militia becoming the Special Reserve (which was allowed to lapse after 1921). 

The Territorial Army remained nominally a separate force from the British Army until renamed under the Defence Reform Act (2014) as the Army Reserve. Its units remain grouped together separately in the British Army order of precedence from their regular army companies and battalions as 26th in order of precedence.

Precedence of the Colonial and Crown Dominion units
Not all colonial and Crown Dominion regular or reserve units had been considered part of the British Army and placed on the order of precedence (although those of the Channel Islands and the Imperial fortress colonies generally were), and Imperial reserve units did not follow the same process of re-organisation and consolidation as the UK ones. Originally, the part-time reserve units in Bermuda, the Channel Islands and Malta had (in 1945) numbered collectively as 28th in order of precedence, but were ordered within that according to the order of their parent corps in the regular army. This meant, by example, that the Bermuda Militia Artillery (BMA), raised in 1895, as part of the Royal Regiment of Artillery, preceded the Bermuda Volunteer Rifle Corps (BVRC), raised in 1894. Today, the Royal Bermuda Regiment, an amalgam of the BMA and BVRC, is ordered 28th.

(27th) The Royal Gibraltar Regiment (As a Colonial Force The Royal Gibraltar Regiment comes after the Army Reserve)
(28th) The Royal Bermuda Regiment

Notes

References

British Army